Jaliscoa may refer to:
 Jaliscoa (plant), a flowering plant genus in the family Asteraceae
 Jaliscoa (wasp), a wasp genus in the family Pteromalidae